"Sneakernight" is a song recorded by American singer Vanessa Hudgens. It is the only single from her second album, Identified. Produced by J. R. Rotem, it was available on iTunes on May 27, 2008. The song and its accompanying music video were used for an Ecko Unlimited commercial.

Critical reception
Maria Dinoia of Common Sense Media stated: "Parents need to know that unlike this High School Musical star's other songs that tend to be about boys and high school relationships, this one is an innocuous song about going dancing. The tame video shows Hudgens putting on her sneakers, heading to the club, and yes, dancing."().

Ryan Dombal of Blender said: "And it all seems innocent enough — but that "basically" makes us think there may be more to these sneakernights than mere dancing. The innuendo is there for those who want to hear it ("Put your sneakers on / Let’s go all night long!"). Teens will dance (and giggle), parents will overpay for the concert and all will be right with the teen pop universe."().

Music video
The music video shows Hudgens going to a house party with a group of friends wearing glowing neon sneakers (Eckō Unltd. shoes). It starts with Hudgens calling her friends on her cell phone, and picking out sneakers. On the second verse, she is now at the party and while on her way to a guy staring at her, she is blocked by another guy who tries to impress her by showing some dance moves. It premiered on Disney.com on June 13, 2008 and on MTV's TRL on July 1, 2008. The video was directed by R. Malcolm Jones.

Charts

Weekly charts

Credits and personnel
Vocals - Vanessa Hudgens
Songwriting - J. R. Rotem, S. Nymoen, L. Solf
Production - J. R. Rotem

Credits are adapted from the Identified album liner notes.

Formats and track listings
Digital download
 "Sneakernight"

Europe download bundle
 "Sneakernight"
 "Sneakernight" (Mr. Mig Retrogroove Edit)
 "Sneakernight" (Albert Castillo Radio Mix)

Sneakernight the Remixes EP
 "Sneakernight" (Albert Castillo Club Mix)
 "Sneakernight" (Albert Castillo Radio Mix)
 "Sneakernight" (Mr. Mig Dub Remix)
 "Sneakernight" (Mr. Mig Retrogroove Edit)
 "Sneakernight" (Mr. Mig Retrogoove Extended)
 "Sneakernight" (Mr. Mig Rhythm Tribal Extended)
 "Sneakernight" (Mr. Mig Rhythm Tribal Radio)

References

2008 singles
2008 songs
2009 singles
Hollywood Records singles
Songs about dancing
Song recordings produced by J. R. Rotem
Songs written by J. R. Rotem
Songs written by Silya
Vanessa Hudgens songs